IBM SPSS Modeler is a data mining and text analytics software application from IBM. It is used to build predictive models and conduct other analytic tasks. It has a visual interface which allows users to leverage statistical and data mining algorithms without programming.

One of its main aims from the outset was to get rid of unnecessary complexity in data transformations, and to make complex predictive models very easy to use.

The first version incorporated decision trees (ID3), and neural networks (backprop), which could both be trained without underlying knowledge of how those techniques worked.

IBM SPSS Modeler was originally named Clementine by its creators, Integral Solutions Limited. This name continued for a while after SPSS's acquisition of the product. SPSS later changed the name to SPSS Clementine, and then later to PASW Modeler. Following IBM's 2009 acquisition of SPSS, the product was renamed IBM SPSS Modeler, its current name.

Applications
SPSS Modeler has been used in these and other industries:
 Customer analytics and Customer relationship management (CRM)
 Fraud detection and prevention
 Optimizing insurance claims
 Risk management
 Manufacturing quality improvement
 Healthcare quality improvement
 Forecasting demand or sales
 Law enforcement and border security
 Education
 Telecommunications
 Entertainment: e.g., predicting movie box office receipts

Editions
IBM sells the current version of SPSS Modeler (version 18.2.1) in two separate bundles of features. These two bundles are called "editions" by IBM:
 SPSS Modeler Professional: used for structured data, such as databases, mainframe data systems, flat files or BI systems
 SPSS Modeler Premium: Includes all the features of Modeler Professional, with the addition of:
– Text analytics

Both editions are available in desktop and server configurations.

In addition to the traditional IBM SPSS Modeler desktop installations, IBM now offers the SPSS Modeler interface as an option in the Watson Studio product line which includes Watson Studio (cloud), Watson Studio Local, and Watson Studio Desktop.

Watson Studio Desktop documentation: https://www.ibm.com/support/knowledgecenter/SSBFT6_1.1.0/mstmap/kc_welcome.html

Release history
 Clementine 1.0 – June 1994 by ISL
 Clementine 5.1 – Jan 2000
 Clementine 12.0 – Jan 2008
 PASW Modeler 13 (formerly Clementine) – April 2009
 IBM SPSS Modeler 14.0 – 2010
 IBM SPSS Modeler 14.2 – 2011
 IBM SPSS Modeler 15.0 – June 2012
 IBM SPSS Modeler 16.0 – December 2013
 IBM SPSS Modeler 17.0 – March 2015
 IBM SPSS Modeler 18.0 -- March 2016 
 IBM SPSS Modeler 18.1 -- June 2017 
 IBM SPSS Modeler 18.2 -- March 2019

Product history
Early versions of the software were called Clementine and were Unix-based. The first version was released on Jun 9th 1994, after Beta testing at 6 customer sites. Clementine was originally developed by a UK company named Integral Solutions Limited (ISL), in Collaboration with Artificial Intelligence researchers at Sussex University. The original Clementine was implemented in Poplog, which ISL marketed for Sussex University.

Clementine mainly used the Poplog languages, Pop11, with some parts written in C for speed (such as the neural network engine), along with additional tools provided as part of Solaris, VMS and various versions of Unix. The tool quickly garnered the attention of the data mining community (at that time in its infancy).

In order to reach a larger market, ISL then Ported Poplog to Microsoft Windows using the NutCracker package, later named MKS Toolkit to provide the Unix graphical facilities. Original in many respects, Clementine was the first data mining tool to use an icon based Graphical user interface rather than requiring users to write in a Programming language, though that option remained available for expert users.

In 1998 ISL was acquired by SPSS Inc., who saw the potential for extended development as a commercial data mining tool. In early 2000 the software was developed into a client / server architecture, and shortly afterward the client front-end interface component was completely re-written and replaced with a new Java front-end, which allowed deeper integration with the other tools provided by SPSS.

SPSS Clementine version 7.0: The client front-end runs under Windows. The server back-end Unix variants (Sun, HP-UX, AIX), Linux, and Windows. The graphical user interface is written in Java.

IBM SPSS Modeler 14.0 was the first release of Modeler by IBM.

IBM SPSS Modeler 15, released in June 2012, introduced significant new functionality for Social Network Analysis and Entity Analytics.

See also
 IBM SPSS Statistics
 List of statistical packages
 Cross Industry Standard Process for Data Mining

References

Further reading

External links
  SPSS Modeler 18.2.1 Documentation
 Users Guide – SPSS Modeler 18.2.1
 IBM SPSS Modeler website
 IBM SPSS Modeler online from cloud

Data mining and machine learning software
Proprietary commercial software for Linux